The Nottingham Symphony Orchestra is the main symphony orchestra for the city of Nottingham.

The NSO was founded in 1933 by Walter Thomas Gaze Cooper as the Midland Conservatory of Music Orchestra. In 1942 it changed its name to become the Nottingham Symphony Orchestra.

References

Nottingham
British symphony orchestras
English orchestras
1933 establishments in England
Musical groups established in 1933